Brandier is a hamlet in north Wiltshire, England, near Minety. Sometimes included as a part of 'Upper Minety'. Until the Counties Act of 1844, it was in Gloucestershire.

Historically Brandier was the site of extensive Roman kilns and potteries which supplied the nearby regional capital of Corinium (Cirencester) with ceramic building materials. 'Minety Ware' was in production until at least the medieval period and has been found as far afield as Germany. 

The hamlet once stood at a crossroads, one road of which, Crow Lane, is now a public right of way. The other, where Crossing Lane is today, roughly corresponds to the Roman road leading to Cirencester, where it connects with the Fosse Way.

The largest dwelling in the hamlet is Brandiers Farm, mostly dating from the 16th century although excavations have shown it to have been built on extensive Roman foundations, making it arguably the oldest building in the parish.

References

 

Hamlets in Wiltshire